The Roman Catholic Diocese of Sosnowiec is a diocese located in the city of Sosnowiec in the Ecclesiastical province of Częstochowa in Poland. As of 2013 weekly Sunday mass attendance was 27.5%, up from 27.4% in the previous year.

History
 March 25, 1992: established as the Diocese of Sosnowiec on territory taken from the Diocese of Częstochowa, the Diocese of Kielce, and the Metropolitan Archdiocese of Kraków.

Special churches
Minor Basilicas
 Bazylika Matki Boskiej Anielskiej, Dąbrowa Górnicza
 Bazylika św. Andrzeja Apostoła in Olkusz(St. Andrew the Apostle)
 Bazylika Katedralna Wniebowzięcia Najświętszej Marii Panny, Sosnowiec(Cathedral Basilica of the Assumption of the Blessed Virgin Mary

Bishops
 Adam Śmigielski (1992−2008)
 Grzegorz Kaszak (since 2009)

See also
Roman Catholicism in Poland

Sources
 GCatholic.org
 Catholic Hierarchy
  Diocese website

Roman Catholic dioceses in Poland
Christian organizations established in 1992
Silesian Voivodeship
Sosnowiec
Roman Catholic dioceses and prelatures established in the 20th century